Zhang Shigong (1906 – 23 September 1992) was a Chinese politician who served as chairman of the Xinjiang Regional Committee of the Chinese People's Political Consultative Conference between 1980 and 1981.

Early life
He had five siblings. He participated in the peasant movement in the autumn of 1926. He joined the Chinese Communist Party in February 1931 and enlisted in the Red Army in April of that same year. Soon after, he was sent to study at Peng–Yang Military School. After graduation, he took part in the counter encirclement and suppression battle in Huhei-Henan-Anhui Soviet Area. After the Red Army suffered crushing defeats at the hands of National Revolutionary Army, he took part in the Long March and reached northwest China's Shaanxi in October 1936.

Second Sino-Japanese War
During the Second Sino-Japanese War, he was political commissar of the headquarters of the 769th Regiment. He led his regiment at the Battle of Yangmingbao Airfield and the Battle of Xiangtangpu. In 1941, he enrolled at the Central Party School of the Chinese Communist Party, staying in April 1944, when he was transferred to the 771th Regiment of 129th Division as political commissar under Commander Liu Bocheng.

Chinese Civil War
During the Chinese Civil War, he was promoted to director of the Political Department of the New Fourth Brigade in 1948 for his actions at the operation for safeguarding Yan'an led by Peng Dehuai in Shaanxi. He also engaged in a number of important battles including the Battle of Qinghuabian, the Battle of Yangmahe, the Battle of Changjiagaoshan, the Battle of Wayaobu, and the Battle of Wazijie. In the battle of Wazijie, his troops captured the Kuomintang chief commander Liu Zhengshi alive and forced the division commander Liu Kan to commit suicide. In August 1948, he was badly wounded in the Battle of Liberating Lanzhou. When he was fully recovered, he was given the position of deputy director of the Political Department of the New Fourth Brigade and marched to Xinjiang with the brigade.

PRC era
After establishment of the Communist State in 1949, he was appointed party secretary of Dihua (now Ürümqi). It would be his first job as "first-in-charge" of a city. In 1952, he became political commissar of the Sixth Army. In October 1956, he was appointed first secretary of Ili Kazakh Autonomous Prefecture, the top political position in the prefecture. In 1966, the Cultural Revolution broke out, he was brought to be persecuted and suffered political persecution. In August 1970, he was reinstated as party secretary of Xinjiang, a position he held until July 1972. In 1978, he took office as vice chairman of the Xinjiang Regional Committee of the Chinese People's Political Consultative Conference, two years later, he was promoted to become chairman, serving in the post until his resignation in 1981.

On 23 September 1992, he died in Ürümqi, aged 85.

References

1906 births
1992 deaths
People from Xin County
Central Party School of the Chinese Communist Party alumni
People's Republic of China politicians from Henan
Chinese Communist Party politicians from Henan